Desta Asgedom (29 February 1972 – 1 September 1992) was an Ethiopian athlete who specialised in middle distance races. A world junior 800 metres champion and an All-Africa Games silver medalist, he died in the United States not long after these achievements.

Biography
Asgedom first came to prominence in 1990 with his performances at the World Junior Championships in Bulgaria, where he won a gold medal in the 800 metres and claimed a bronze medal in the 1500 metres race. In the same year he was a bronze medalist in the 800 metres at the African Championships in Cairo.

In 1991 he competed in the World Championships, which were held in Tokyo. Soon after he represented Ethiopia at the 1991 All-Africa Games and finished with the silver medal in the 1500 metres.

He came to the United States early in 1992 to attend California's Riverside Community College. In August he got an offer of a scholarship to Wayland Baptist in Texas and spent a week on campus before deciding to decline, due to the lack of a large Ethiopian community, like there was at Riverside.

Death
Asgedom was killed when on 1 September 1992 he was struck by a pickup truck while out running on Washington Boulevard in Pico Rivera, California. He died from his injuries at Whittier Presbyterian Hospital, 25 minutes after being hit. His death was ruled a suicide by the L.A. County Sheriff's Department. The verdict from the Sheriff's Department was based on the results of an autopsy and witnesses accounts. The truck driver said that Asgedom had been standing facing traffic waiting to cross and made eye contact before he dove in front of the incoming vehicle. Two other witnesses corroborated the claim that Asgedom had jumped in front of the truck.

His coach, Ted Banks, described Asgedom as a "tremendous runner" who with some more experience "had the potential to be an Olympic medal winner".

References

External links

1972 births
1992 suicides
Ethiopian male middle-distance runners
African Games silver medalists for Ethiopia
African Games medalists in athletics (track and field)
World Athletics Championships athletes for Ethiopia
Ethiopian expatriate sportspeople in the United States
Suicides in California
Pedestrian road incident deaths
Athletes (track and field) at the 1991 All-Africa Games